Putney is an unincorporated community in Kanawha County, West Virginia, United States.  Its post office is closed.

The community was named after Mose Putney, a local merchant.

References 

Unincorporated communities in West Virginia
Unincorporated communities in Kanawha County, West Virginia